Zamboanga Peninsula is an administrative region in the Philippines, designated as Region IX. It consists of three provinces (Zamboanga del Norte, Zamboanga Sibugay and Zamboanga del Sur) including four cities (Dapitan, Dipolog, Pagadian, Isabela) and the highly urbanized Zamboanga City. The region was previously known as Western Mindanao before the signing of Executive Order No. 36 of 2001. The city of Zamboanga was designated as the regional center until Pagadian was designated as its new regional center, although Zamboanga City remains the region's cultural, economic, and educational center.

History

Ancient era
During the ancient era, the Zamboanga peninsula was a vast territory home to various ethnic groups – the largest of which was the Subanen people. Later on, the southern coastal areas of the region were under the influence of the Javanese Majapahit Empire, although the empire never did conquer the area.

Sultanate of Maguindanao era
In the 14th century, the Sultanate of Sulu ruled the southwestern sections of the peninsula. By the late 15th century and early 16th century, Malay missionaries further spread Islam in the southern Philippines. Sharif Kabungsuwan, a Johore-born missionary of Malay and Arab descent established the Sultanate of Maguindanao, which the entire island of Mindanao is named after. The sultanate also occupied the entire island except present-day Caraga region and eastern portions of Davao region, stretching from the Zamboanga Peninsula to modern-day Davao City, while the Sultanate of Sulu lost its territories in Zamboanga. Magauindanao's sultans provided Mindanao fierce armed resistance against the Spanish occupation, especially under the lead of Muhammad Kudarat. They soon allied themselves with the Sulu sultanate. The Muslim natives of the region were collectively known as Moros by the Spanish, meaning "Moor", though the Iberian Moors and the Philippine Muslims had little cultural connection outside of following Islam. A large chunk of the Spanish–Moro conflict, the war between the Spanish and Mindanao's Muslim natives took place in the Zamboanga Peninsula.

Spanish rule
In 1569 Zamboanga was chosen as the site of the Spanish settlement and garrison on La Caldera (now called Barrio Recodo). Zamboanga was one of the main strongholds in Mindanao, supporting colonizing efforts in the south of the island and making way for Christian settlements. It also served as a military outpost, protecting the island against foreign invaders and Moro pirates and their Chinese allies. The province, named and centered on Zamboanga City was partly founded by Peruvian soldiers brought by Sebastián Hurtado de Corcuera.

The Zamboanga Peninsula played a central role in the Spanish–Moro conflict. It was the site of constant battling between Spanish soldiers and Moro pirate raids. While the Spanish successfully established churches in the region, they suffered heavily at the hands of Moro raiders, and had to repeatedly withdraw from the region. While the Spanish achieved a tactical victory by launching several attacks against the Sultanate of Sulu, constant fighting and attacks persisted, giving the Moros a psychological victory.

Province of Zamboanga
After the United States annexed the Spanish East Indies in 1898, the peninsula hosted a briefly independent state called the Republic of Zamboanga. It was incorporated by the Insular Government into the Moro Province, which consisted of the central and western parts of Mindanao and the Sulu Archipelago. The name and status of Moro Province were changed to the Department of Mindanao and Sulu on August 16, 1916, causing Zamboanga to become a separate province.

In 1942, the Zamboanga Peninsula along with the rest of the Philippine Islands was occupied by the Empire of Japan at the beginning of the Second World War. The Peninsula was liberated in 1945 by joint American and Philippine Commonwealth forces fighting against the Imperial Japanese Army.

On June 6, 1952, the province was partitioned into Zamboanga del Norte and Zamboanga del Sur, while the chartered city of Zamboanga became part of Zamboanga del Sur.

Region
Together with the Sulu Archipelago, the provinces that formerly made up Zamboanga Province were re-organised into Region IX by order of Presidential Decree No. 1 as part of the Integrated Reorganization Plan of President Ferdinand Marcos, that was signed on September 24, 1972.

From 1975 to 1989, the old Region IX (Western Mindanao) was further divided into two sub-regions by Presidential Decree No. 8233 dated August 21, 1975. Sub-Region IX-A consisted of Basilan, Sulu and Tawi-Tawi with Jolo, Sulu, as the sub-regional center, while Sub-Region IX-B consisted of the provinces of Zamboanga del Norte, Zamboanga del Sur and Zamboanga Sibugay, with the chartered city of Zamboanga City as the sub-regional centre.

Present
In 2001, Zamboanga Sibugay, was created from the province of Zamboanga del Sur with Ipil as the seat of government with the virtue of Republic Act No. 8973.

In the same year, the residents of Basilan opted to join the Autonomous Region in Muslim Mindanao (ARMM) in a plebiscite. However, the citizens of the capital, Isabela, did not want to join so the city remained a part of this region as a result of Executive Order No. 36 last until 2014 only.

In 2004, Pagadian officially became the Regional Center for Region XVI- Zamboanga Peninsula, despite opposition from Zamboanga City, the former Regional Center.

Regional center issue
In 1978, Presidential Decree No. 1555 transferred Region IX's regional center from Jolo, Sulu to Zamboanga City.

Executive Order (EO) No. 429 was issued in 1990 by President Corazon Aquino which provided for the reorganization of the administrative regions in Mindanao. It declared that Western Mindanao would comprise Zamboanga City, Lanao del Norte, Misamis Occidental, Zamboanga del Sur, Zamboanga del Norte, Basilan, and the cities comprising those provinces. It also declared that Pagadian City shall serve as the new regional center.

In 1996, President Fidel Ramos issued EO No. 325 which reorganized the Regional Development Councils (RDCs). The Implementing Rules and Regulations (IRR) of EO No. 325 also declared Pagadian City as the regional center in Western Mindanao.

In 2001, President Gloria Macapagal Arroyo signed EO No. 36 which reorganized and renamed Western Mindanao to Zamboanga Peninsula. It was silent on the issue of regional government centers. Memorandum Circular No. 75, signed in 2004 by Executive Secretary Eduardo Ermita, directed the transfer of regional offices from Zamboanga City to Pagadian citing EO 429 as its legal basis.

A moratorium on the transfer under Memorandum Circular No. 11 was issued on December 22, 2010, citing the high economic and social costs that the employees were experiencing in maintaining two residences and in fully transferring to Pagadian. It further directed all regional offices that are already in Pagadian to continue their operations.

On March 3, 2011, the Regional Development Council IX endorsed Zamboanga City as the regional center of Zamboanga Peninsula. This endorsement remains unacted to date.

National Economic and Development Authority Regional Director Arturo Valero stated that “even if Zamboanga City is not the regional center, the city will still grow” and that the city should better focus on being a commercial and industrial center.

On June 30, 2020, Malacañang, under President Rodrigo Duterte, lifted Memorandum Circular No. 11 (issued by previous administration), allowing the remaining regional offices to transfer to Pagadian after almost 15 years. However, the departments of Trade and Industry, Tourism, and Labor and Employment will remain in Zamboanga City, being the region's center of commerce and industry.

Geography
The region is located on the western part of the island of Mindanao, that lies between the Moro Gulf (part of the Celebes Sea) and the Sulu Sea. Along the shores of the peninsula are numerous bays and islands of varying sizes. The peninsula is connected to the rest of Mindanao through an isthmus situated between Panguil Bay and Pagadian Bay. The region consists of the three Zamboanga provinces and the highly urbanized independent city of Zamboanga, and the boundary between the peninsula and mainland is artificially marked by the border between the provinces of Zamboanga del Sur and Lanao del Norte.

Administrative divisions

Provinces
Zamboanga Peninsula comprises 3 provinces; 1 independent, chartered and highly urbanized city; 3 component cities; 67 municipalities and 1,904 barangays.

Governors and vice governors

Cities

Isabela is a component city and the former capital of the province of Basilan. In 2017, the seat of Basilan's government was moved to Lamitan. Isabela continues to be under the jurisdiction of Basilan for the administration of provincially devolved services and functions, but for the administration of regional services, the city is part of the Zamboanga Peninsula Region while the rest of Basilan is under the authority of the  Bangsamoro Autonomous Region in Muslim Mindanao.

Isabela was the southernmost outpost of the Spanish in the Philippines until the fall of Jolo in 1878. It hosted Catholic residents since 1637, and a Spanish Fort (destroyed in World War II) since 1848, It also was the primary naval base of the Spanish in Mindanao until 1899. Named after Queen Isabella II, the city is the southernmost predominantly Christian enclave of the Philippines, and serves as an entry point for trade and commerce of Basilan island.

Dapitan is also known as the "Shrine City in the Philippines" because it was the place where José Rizal, the National Hero, was exiled. It is also known for the old St. James Parish and the beach resort of Dakak.

Dipolog, capital of Zamboanga del Norte, is known for their abundance of orchids, thus it is called "Orchid City of the South" or "Orchid City". They have their nature spots and historical spots, such as Dipolog Cathedral, Dipolog Boulevard, Cogon Park, Japanese Park, Plaza Magsaysay, the Sungkilaw Falls, and the 3,003 steps to Linabo Peak.

Pagadian is known as the "Little Hong Kong of the South" because of its topographical feature that is reminiscent of Hong Kong. It also has an affluent Chinese community that officially celebrates the Chinese Lunar New Year.

Zamboanga City is the only Independent, chartered city and highly urbanized city in the region. The city is the lone member of BIMP-EAGA in the Zamboanga Peninsula. Zamboanga City generates more than half of the economy of the region. It also has the largest airport and seaport and the city in the region with most investors.

Demographics

Economy

It has the first export-processing zone in Mindanao. Farming and fishing are the main economic activities of the region. It also has rice and corn mills, oil processing, coffee berry processing and processing of latex from rubber. Its home industries include rattan and furniture craft, basket making, weaving and brass work. Dipolog is home to a number of Bottled Sardines Companies which are being exported abroad. Dakak Park and Beach Resort can be found in Dapitan it is one of the most visited places in the region along with Gloria's Fantasyland the first and only theme park in Vismin.

Resources
The region has vast forest resources and previously used to export logs, lumber, veneer and plywood. Mineral deposits include gold, chromite, coal, iron, lead, and manganese. Among its non-metallic reserves are coal, silica, salt, marble, silica sand, and gravel. Its fishing grounds are devoted to commercial and municipal fishing. It has also aqua farms for brackish water and freshwater fishes.

Area of Growth
The economic fulcrum of the region lies at the center of the peninsula that is the area connecting Ipil and Liloy. Along with its premiere towns of Sindangan and Molave, it has the fastest economic activity of the region. The 50-kilometer link between the north and the south would act as the main artery of economy in the region.

Infrastructure

Roads and Bridges
 Zamboanga City By-Pass Road – This by-pass road is a 36.77 km with a 12 meter wide, 2 lane road with slope protection, the route starts at the junction of MCLL National Highway and Barangay Culianan, traversing Barangay Culianan – Sinubong. The project was started on January 9, 2012, and was completed on December 28, 2018.

References

External links 
 
 
 

 
Geography of Mindanao
Regions of the Philippines
Landforms of the Sulu Sea
Peninsulas of the Philippines
Landforms of Zamboanga del Norte
Landforms of Zamboanga del Sur
Landforms of Zamboanga Sibugay